Ronnie Rivers (born January 31, 1999) is an American football running back for the Los Angeles Rams of the National Football League (NFL). He was signed by the Arizona Cardinals after being undrafted in the 2022 NFL Draft. He played college football at Fresno State.

Early years 
Rivers attended Freedom High School in Oakley, California, where he rushed for 2,239 yards and scored 33 touchdowns as a senior.

Professional career

Arizona Cardinals
Rivers was signed as an undrafted free agent by the Arizona Cardinals on May 2, 2022. He was released on August 14, 2022.

Seattle Seahawks
On August 24, 2022, Rivers was signed by the Seattle Seahawks. He was waived on August 28.

Los Angeles Rams
On September 15, 2022, the Los Angeles Rams signed Rivers to their practice squad. He was promoted to the active roster on November 26, 2022. He appeared in nine games as a rookie.

References

External links 

 Los Angeles Rams bio
 Fresno State Bulldogs bio

1999 births
Living people
American football running backs
Fresno State Bulldogs football players
Arizona Cardinals players
Seattle Seahawks players
Los Angeles Rams players